Reckord is an English surname. Notable people with the surname include:

Barry Reckord (1926–2011), Jamaican playwright
Jamie Reckord (born 1992), English footballer
Lloyd Reckord (born 1929), Jamaican actor
Milton Reckord (1879–1975), United States Army general

See also
 Record (surname)

English-language surnames